Wilhelm Nielsen (22 May 1901 – 9 January 1960) was a Norwegian footballer. He played in three matches for the Norway national football team from 1922 to 1925.

References

External links
 

1901 births
1960 deaths
Norwegian footballers
Norway international footballers
Place of birth missing
Association footballers not categorized by position